South Oropouche is a community in Trinidad and Tobago. It is at sea level. There is an archaeological site at St John's Road, South Oropouche. Dow Village is in South Oropouche.

References

Populated places in Trinidad and Tobago